Ericeia leichardtii is a moth in the family Erebidae. It is found on Fiji, Tonga, the Loyalty Islands Samoa and in northern Australia.

References

Moths described in 1885
Ericeia